Ishii Station is the name of two train stations in Japan:

 Ishii Station (Hyōgo)
 Ishii Station (Tokushima)